The Agusan del Sur Provincial Board is the Sangguniang Panlalawigan (provincial legislature) of the Philippine province of Agusan del Sur.

The members are elected via plurality-at-large voting: the province is divided into two districts, each sending five members to the provincial board; the electorate votes for five members, with the five candidates with the highest number of votes being elected. The vice governor is the ex officio presiding officer, and only votes to break ties. The vice governor is elected via the plurality voting system province-wide.

District apportionment

List of members
An additional three ex officio members are the presidents of the provincial chapters of the Association of Barangay Captains, the Councilors' League, and the Sangguniang Kabataan. There is also a reserved seat for a representative of the indigenous peoples pursuant to the Indigenous Peoples' Rights Act of 1997.

Current members 
These are the members after the 2022 local elections and 2018 barangay and SK elections:

 Vice Governor: Samuel Tortor (NUP)

Vice Governor

1st District

2nd District

References

Provincial boards in the Philippines
Politics of Agusan del Sur